Torricella Sicura is a town and comune in the province of Teramo, in the Abruzzo region of central Italy. It is located in the natural park known as the "Gran Sasso e Monti della Laga National Park".

Geography
It is divided into neighborhoods :
Torricella Oscura
Torricella Scarpone - the area surrounding the town castle
Torricella Romana - the area surrounding the house of the illustrious Romani family
Torricella Case Nuove - area in which homes have most recently been constructed
Centro - town centre

History
The town most likely takes the first part of its name from an ancient castle once found just to the north.  The local gentry still refer to this area as "lu castille" (the castle).  In the late 18th century there is mention of a tunnel that led from the castle to the surrounding countryside.  Legend has it that somewhere in this area is an enormous grotto containing a vast treasure under the watchful of an enormous serpent.  The second part of the town's name, "Sicura" is thought to be a derivation of "Sicula", with reference to an indigenous people living in the area in the first millennium BC.

Surrounding the town are vestiges of Roman Empire and High Middle Ages epochs.  Also present are temple ruins, ancient Roman graves, and a mysterious altar dedicated to an unknown deity.  One monumental inscription is dedicated to the High Priestess "Numisia" and others speak of the presence of a thermal bathhouse.

Sights
Located in the town is a private museum devoted to the folklore of Torricella Sicura and the surrounding area.  It includes more than 16,000 pieces of memorabilia divided into three main sections.  The first is a presentation of very detailed and accurate historical farming scenes done in miniature 1:5 scale.  The second is collection of farming tools, many of which date from the 19th and early 20th centuries.  The third portion is a "virtual museum" in which information about the customs and typical professions of the past is presented in a multimedia internet site.  The founder of the museum, Gino Di Benedetto, has taken great care and expense to make his collection of historical objects as authentic as possible.
The main place of worship in Torricella Sicura is the Parish Church, Saint Paul the Apostle, named after the patron saint of the town.  It is located in the center of Torricella Sicura and is noted for its majestic bell tower.   
A smaller church is called Madonna delle Vergini (Madonna of the Virgins), often referred to as "Chiesa della Cona" (Church of the Icon) in reference to its links to the Virgin Mother.

Famous residents
Torricella Sicura is known as the birthplace of Mario Capuani, a young doctor who supported the Italian partisans and was subsequently shot to death by German troops during the last phases of World War II.

Frazioni (outlying areas)
Abetemozzo, Antanemuccio, Borgonovo, Colle Fiorito, Colle Sansonesco, Corvacchiano, Costumi, Faognano, Fornaci, Galliano, Ginepri, Ioanella, Magliano, Morricone, Pastignano, Piano Grande, Poggio Rattieri, Poggio Valle, Prognetto, San Felice, San Pietro ad Azzano, Santa Chiara, Santo Stefano, Scorzone, Tizzano, Valle Piola, Villa Popolo, Villa Riccio, Villa Tofo

References

External links
 Commune of Torricella Sicura  . 
Mario Capuani  
Folklore Museum of Gino Di Benedetto    
Parish of Torricella Sicura - Saint Paul the Apostle  

Cities and towns in Abruzzo